Chambers Flat is a rural locality in the City of Logan, Queensland, Australia.

Geography

The locality is bounded to the east and south by the Logan River.

History
Pastoral runs were established in the district from the early 1840s. John Chambers took up land in the area in 1848, and the district is presumably named after him.

Chambers Flat Provisional School opened on 27 October 1890 under head teacher Miss Mary Curran. It became Chambers Flat State School in 1909. It closed on 3 August 1921. The school was on a  site at 33-51 Holloway Road.

Formerly in the Shire of Beaudesert, Chambers Flat became part of Logan City following the local government amalgamations in March 2008.

The median/average age of the Chambers Flat population recorded a population of 42 people years of age, 5 years above the Australian average.  75.3% of people living in Chambers Flat were born in Australia. The other top responses for country of birth were England 6%, New Zealand 4.2%, Taiwan 1.1%, Laos 1.1%, Vietnam 1%.  86.8% of people spoke only English at home; the next most common languages were 2.3% Hmong, 1.3% Vietnamese, 1.2% Mandarin, 1.1% Mon-Khmer, nec, 0.7% Khmer.

King's Christian College opened its third campus in Chambers Flat in 2020. It opened its first campus in Reedy Creek in 1980. It opened its second campus at Pimpama in 2015.

References

Further reading
   — includes information on Chambers Flat State School

External links 

 
 

Suburbs of Logan City
Localities in Queensland